Tippecanoe Township is one of seventeen townships in Kosciusko County, Indiana. As of the 2010 census, its population was 6,661 and it contained 5,127 housing units.

Tippecanoe Township was organized in 1838.

Geography

Cities and towns
 North Webster

Unincorporated towns
 Barbee at 
 Bayfield at 
 Forest Glen at 
 Highbanks at 
 Kalorama Park at 
 Lakeview Spring at 
 Mineral Springs at 
 Potawatomi Park at 
 Walker Park at 
 Yellowbanks at 
(This list is based on USGS data and may include former settlements.)

Education 
Tippecanoe Township residents may obtain a free library card from the North Webster Community Public Library in North Webster.

References

External links
 Indiana Township Association
 United Township Association of Indiana
 The Watershed Foundation

Townships in Kosciusko County, Indiana
Townships in Indiana